Gabriel Thomas Brown (born March 5, 2000) is a professional basketball player for Raptors 905 of the NBA G League. He played college basketball for the Michigan State Spartans.

High school career
Brown played basketball for Belleville High School in Belleville, Michigan. He did not make the varsity team to start his sophomore season but was promoted for the final eight games. As a junior, Brown averaged 15.9 points and 5.7 rebounds per game. In his senior season, he averaged 18.6 points, 5.7 rebounds and 2.1 assists per game. Brown was a four-star recruit and committed to playing college basketball for Michigan State.

College career
As a freshman at Michigan State, Brown had a limited role on a team that reached the Final Four of the NCAA tournament, averaging 2.3 points in 8 minutes per game. In his sophomore season, he averaged 6.8 points and 3.6 rebounds per game. As a junior, Brown averaged 7.2 points and 2.7 rebounds per game. On December 29, 2021, he scored a career-high 24 points in an 81–68 win against High Point. Brown was named to the Third Team All-Big Ten by the coaches. As a senior, he averaged 11.6 points and 3.8 rebounds per game.

Professional career
On August 3, 2022, Brown signed an Exhibit 10 contract with the Toronto Raptors. He was added to the roster of their NBA G League affiliate, Raptors 905.

Career statistics

College

|-
| style="text-align:left;"| 2018–19
| style="text-align:left;"| Michigan State
| 32 || 0 || 8.0 || .390 || .372 || 1.000 || 1.2 || .1 || .1 || .1 || 2.3
|-
| style="text-align:left;"| 2019–20
| style="text-align:left;"| Michigan State
| 31 || 16 || 21.9 || .436 || .341 || .947 || 3.6 || .5 || .3 || .4 || 6.8
|-
| style="text-align:left;"| 2020–21
| style="text-align:left;"| Michigan State
| 25 || 5 || 20.7 || .471 || .420 || .882 || 2.7 || .5 || .4 || .5 || 7.2
|-
| style="text-align:left;"| 2021–22
| style="text-align:left;"| Michigan State
| 36 || 36 || 28.9 || .428 || .382 || .894 || 3.8 || 1.1 || .7 || .3 || 11.6
|- class="sortbottom"
| style="text-align:center;" colspan="2"| Career
| 124 || 57 || 20.1 || .435 || .379 || .896 || 2.9 || .6 || .4 || .3 || 7.1

Personal life
Brown's father, Charles, died on May 27, 2016 at age 61 from complications after suffering two strokes. After his father's death, Brown was raised by his older brother, Nick, who played basketball for William Penn University.

References

External links
Michigan State Spartans bio

2000 births
Living people
American expatriate basketball people in Canada
American men's basketball players
Basketball players from Michigan
Michigan State Spartans men's basketball players
Raptors 905 players
Small forwards
Sportspeople from Ypsilanti, Michigan